Averham  is a village and civil parish in the Newark and Sherwood district of Nottinghamshire, England.  According to the 2001 census it had a population of 187, increasing to 294 at the 2011 census. The village is just west of Newark-on-Trent.  Staythorpe Power Station is south-west of the village.

Church

Averham is the location of Church of St. Michael and All Angels, Averham, which is a Grade I listed building.

Theatrical tradition

For many decades, the village has been famous locally for the Robin Hood Theatre. The 150-seat theatre was designed by built Reverend Joseph Cyril Walker and built on the grounds of Averham Rectory, in 1913, by the village carpenter, Robert Lee. Its original name was Robin Hood Opera House. The Youth section of the Robin Hood Theatre has become an important part of its function, and performs regularly in the Nottingham And Nottinghamshire Drama Association Festival.

The theatre closed in 1951, then reopened 1n 1961 as a public theatre under a charitable trust. After a financial struggle, the County Council took over the trusteeship in 1981. In 2007, the theatre was closed by the county because of safety concerns.

In 2014, the theatre group, which had been performing in schools and village halls, announced that they had raised more than £50,000 toward renovation of the theatre. Contributors include Ian McKellen, Judi Dench, and Sylvia Syms.

See also
Listed buildings in Averham

Notes

External links 

 History of the Sutton family at Averham
 

Newark and Sherwood
Villages in Nottinghamshire